Maxine Alderton is a British screenwriter, best known for her work on the BBC science fiction television series Doctor Who.

Career
Beginning as a script editor in the mid 2000s, Alderton graduated to writing for the long-running ITV soap opera Emmerdale, writing over 120 episodes since 2013. She won Best Writer at the Royal Television Society Yorkshire Awards in 2017.

She has also written for the first two series of The Worst Witch, and in 2020, contributed the eighth episode of the twelfth series of Doctor Who, "The Haunting of Villa Diodati." The episode was set on the night Mary Shelley was inspired to write Frankenstein. She returned to co-write the fourth episode, "Village of the Angels," with Chris Chibnall for the thirteenth series (known as Flux). The episode saw the return of recurring villains, the Weeping Angels. It is the only episode to be written by someone other than showrunner Chibnall. The episode also featured a mid-credits scene, something unusual for the programme.

References

External links
 

Living people
21st-century British women writers
British soap opera writers
British television writers
Women soap opera writers
British women television writers
Women science fiction and fantasy writers
Year of birth missing (living people)